Jean-Baptiste Feuvrier (called Joannès; 6 October 1842 – 29 November 1926) was a French military physician, who, from August 1889 to October 1892, served as the personal physician to Naser al-Din Shah Qajar (1848–1896), King (Shah) of Qajar Iran. He wrote a travelogue about his life in Iran, the Trois ans à la cour de Perse. Prior to his appointment in Iran, he served as a personal physician to Prince Nicholas of Montenegro (r. 1860–1918).

Biography
Feuvrier was born in Saulx, Haute-Saône to François Antoine, a military veterinary surgeon. In 1861–1865, he attended the Military School of Hygiene in Strasbourg, and earned a post-doc at Val-de-Grâce in Paris. Feuvrier served in Algeria (1861–1865) and Colmar (1869). He participated in the Franco-Prussian War.

Feuvrier then served as a personal physician to Prince Nicholas of Montenegro (r. 1860–1918). He also participated under Nicholas I in the Herzegovina uprising (1875–1877) directed against the Ottoman Empire.

Feuvrier succeeded another Frenchman, Joseph Désiré Tholozan, as the Shah's personal physician. Though his knowledge of Persian language and culture was limited (learned mainly on the spot), his travelogue provides invaluable first-hand information on an important period during the Qajar era. It is a major source of information in relation to the Tobacco Concession and the Tobacco Protest. Through his personal interest in Persian culture, Feuvrier's travelogue also provides important information on Iran's archaeology, architecture, urbanism, economy, and social life.

He was awarded the Order of the Lion and the Sun (1st class with green sash) and the Légion d’Honneur (chevalier, 1875; officier, 1890). In addition to his native French, and Persian, Feuvrier held linguistic abilities in Serbian, Italian, Russian, English, and German. He died at Saulx.

References

Sources
 

1842 births
1926 deaths
French expatriates in Iran
People of Qajar Iran
19th-century French physicians
20th-century French physicians
French travel writers
Officiers of the Légion d'honneur
Chevaliers of the Légion d'honneur
French military doctors
People from Haute-Saône
French people of the Franco-Prussian War
French expatriates in Montenegro